Edgar Fleischer Carroll (July 27, 1907 – October 13, 1984) was a pitcher in Major League Baseball. He was born in Baltimore, Maryland.

Carroll played briefly for the 1929 Boston Red Sox who finished in last place in the American League, winning only 58 games and losing 96, 48 games behind the Philadelphia Athletics champions. Used mostly as a middle reliever and occasional starter, Carroll posted a 1–0 record with 13 strikeouts and a 5.61 ERA in 24 appearances, including three starts and 67.1 innings pitched. He also ranked 10th in the league with 13 games finished.

Carroll died in Rossville, Maryland, at age 77.

Sources

Retrosheet

Boston Red Sox players
Major League Baseball pitchers
Baseball players from Baltimore
1907 births
1984 deaths